The 1950–51 season was the 36th in the history of the Isthmian League, an English football competition.

At the end of the previous season Tufnell Park merged with Edmonton Borough to form Tufnell Park Edmonton. Leytonstone were champions for the second season in a row, winning their seventh Isthmian League title.

League table

References

Isthmian League seasons
I